Queen Square Bus Station serves the city of Liverpool, Merseyside, England. The bus station is owned and managed by Merseytravel.

It is situated adjacent to Queen Square in the city centre and is approximately 300 metres away from the Lime Street railway station.

There are 13 bus stands and a travel centre at the bus station. Buses from the bus station run around the city and  go as far as Bootle, Kirkby, Preston, Runcorn, St Helens and Widnes. Most of Liverpool's night buses start from the bus station.

Companies such as Arriva North West, Stagecoach Merseyside & South Lancashire, HTL Buses operate services from this station.

References

External links
 Queen Square Bus Station - Geograph UK
 Queen Square Travel Shop - Merseytravel

Bus stations in Merseyside
Transport in Liverpool
Buildings and structures in Liverpool